The lokator (lat. locator: landlord, land allocator, from Latin  to allocate, rent, establish, settle or locate; also magister incolarum; in Mecklenburg and Pomerania also  or , similar to the Reutemeister in South Germany) was a medieval sub-contractor, who was responsible to a territorial lord or landlord for the clearing, survey and apportionment of land that was to be settled. In addition, he hired settlers for this purpose, provided their means of subsistence during the transitional period (e.g. during the clearing of the land) and made materiel and implements available, such as seed, draught animals, iron ploughs, etc. He thus played a key role during the establishment of new towns and villages, as well as the clearing of uncultivated land during the phase of internal colonisation (Binnenkolonisation) in North German and the German Ostsiedlung and participated in its success.

Literature 
 Matthias Hardt: Linien und Säume, Zonen und Räume an der Ostgrenze des Reiches im frühen und hohen Mittelalter, in: Walter Pohl / Helmut Reimitz (ed.): Grenze und Differenz im frühen Mittelalter, Vienna, 2000, pp. 39-57.
 Matthias Hardt: Formen und Wege der hochmittelalterlichen Siedlungsgründung, in: Enno Bünz (ed.): Ostsiedlung und Landesausbau in Sachsen. Die Kührener Urkunde von 1154 und ihr historisches Umfeld, Leipzig, 2008, pp.143-160.
 Herbert Helbig (ed.): Urkunden und erzählende Quellen zur deutschen Ostsiedlung im Mittelalter. Vol. 1: Mittel- und Norddeutschland. Ostseeküste, Darmstadt, 1975.
 Franz Kössler: "Die Nachfahren des Lokators" - zur Siedlungsgeschichte einer deutschsprachigen Landschaft im böhmisch–mährischen Raum, Bad Schussenried, 2010.
 Paul Richard Kötzschke: Das Unternehmertum in der ostdeutschen Kolonisation des Mittelalters (Diss.), Bautzen, 1894.
 Josef Joachim Menzel: Der Beitrag der Urkundenwissenschaft zur Erforschung der deutschen Ostsiedlung am Beispiel Schlesiens, in: Walter Schelsinger (ed.): Die deutsche Ostsiedlung des Mittelalters als Problem der europäischen Geschichte. Reichenau-Vorträge 1970-1972, Sigmaringen, 1975, pp. 131 - 159.

References 

Social history of the Holy Roman Empire
History of Pomerania